East Verde Estates is a census-designated place in Gila County in the U.S. state of Arizona. East Verde Estates  is located approximately six miles north of the town of Payson, off Arizona State Route 87. The population as of the 2010 U.S. Census was 170.

Geography

Demographics

References

Census-designated places in Gila County, Arizona